Action Directe (AD, "direct action") was a French far-left militant group which committed a series of assassinations and violent attacks in France between 1979 and 1987. Members of Action directe considered themselves libertarian communists who had formed an "urban guerrilla organization". The French government banned the group. During its existence, AD's members murdered 12 people, and wounded a further 26. It associated at various times with the Red Brigades (Italy), Red Army Faction (West Germany), Prima Linea (Italy), Armed Nuclei for Popular Autonomy (France), Communist Combatant Cells, Lebanese Armed Revolutionary Factions, Irish National Liberation Army et cetera.

Elisabeth Van Dyck Commando 

The Elisabeth Van Dyck Commando was a branch of Action Directe that assassinated French Army General René Audran, on 25 January 1985. He was the Director of International Affairs (DAI) at the General Delegation for Armament (DGA).  The team was named to commemorate Red Army Faction member Elisabeth Van Dyck.

The Elisabeth Van Dyck Commando was originally named after a second-generation RAF (Red Army Faction) member, Elisabeth von Dyck. This commando was created as a combined extension of both the Action Directe (AD) and the Red Army Faction (RAF).  The AD appeared to take care of the organizational side of this commando, and so naming it after a memorialized member of the RAF makes sense if they were seeking to at least publicly have a unified front.  Both the RAF and the AD were actively pursuing their shared goal of political autonomy within their home countries, respectively with the RAF being based in Germany and the AD being based in France.  These groups' goal of political autonomy did not stop with their own countries however, and they often fought against their own countries' governments in the pursuit of political autonomy, or political freedom, for the world's working class.

This commando had only one claimed attack, the assassination of French Army General René Audran on January 25, 1985.  At the time of his death, Audran was a senior-level official in the French Ministry of Defense--specifically the Corps of Armament.  The Elisabeth van Dyck Commando took credit for the assassination via letter.  In the letter the members explained that they had killed Audran because he was the head of French's foreign arms sales and they believed that his "military and economic function is at the heart of the strategic imperialist project".  The "project" being referred to is what the AD and RAF believed to be NATO and its supporting European countries' goal of homogenizing the world into a capitalist culture, and that as they progressed along this goal it would widen the gap in power and money between the upper class and working class.

Arrests

In December 1981 an Action Directe member Lahouari Benchellal, called "Farid", was arrested for forging traveler's cheques, which were an important income source for the organization, in Helsinki, Finland. He hung himself while in the custody of the Finnish Security Intelligence Service in January 1982. Action Directe did not believe Benchellal killed himself, and they named a direct action group after him.

There is an ongoing campaign by some sections of the French far-left that the Action Directe members still imprisoned, who consider themselves political prisoners, should be paroled.  In December 2007, Jean-Marc Rouillan was allowed a state of "semi-liberty", able to leave prison for extended periods. In September 2008, a Parisian court called for the revoking of this status after he declared in an interview with L'Express that "I remain convinced that armed struggle is necessary at certain moments of the revolutionary process".

See also
 Autonomism
 Elisabeth Van Dyck Commando
 Lebanese Armed Revolutionary Factions
 Revolutionary Front for Proletarian Action

References

Bibliography
 
 
 Protestation devant les libertaires du présent et du futur sur les capitulations de 1980, Jean-Claude Lutanie, (originally published in 1981 under the pseudonym Un Incontrole, no publisher, re-published in 2011 by Editions Lutanie)

External links
Sites campaigning for the release of the Action directe convicts:
www.action-directe.net (in French)
Campaign for the release of Action directe prisoners (in French)
 
 https://socialhistoryportal.org/sites/default/files/raf/0319850125_0.pdf
 https://books.google.com/books?id=yLH0BgAAQBAJ&pg=PA232&hl=en#v=onepage&q&f=false
 https://www.telegraph.co.uk/news/worldnews/europe/france/3119083/Terrorist-group-Action-Directe-founder-does-not-regret-murders.html
 "Action Directe" July 2018.  Retrieved 10 May 2019. (The commando's one attack is listed under Action Directe in GTD.)

Anti-fascist organizations by country
Anti-imperialist organizations
Autonomism
Communism in France
Communist organizations
Communist terrorism
Defunct anarchist militant groups
Defunct anarchist organizations in France
Defunct communist militant groups
Far-left politics in France
Left-wing militant groups in France
Maoist organizations in France
Terrorism in France